Anzor Erkomaishvili (10 August 1940 – 31 March 2021) was a Georgian singer, composer, and folk music researcher. He is known for his long-standing work as musical director of the folk choir Rustavi Ensemble since 1968 and efforts for preserving the folk singing heritage of Georgia.

Biography
Anzor Erkomaishvili was born in Batumi in then-Soviet Georgia into a family with a longstanding musical tradition. His grandfather was the Georgian folk singer Artem Erkomaishvili. He graduated from the Tbilisi State Conservatoire in 1969. Still being a student, he began collecting and transcribing the polyphonic Georgian folk repertoire, particularly from the province of Guria. In 1968, he founded the Rustavi Choir which toured throughout Georgia and abroad for decades.

Erkomaishvili's work on researching, compiling and safeguarding the folk singing legacy earned him many awards, including the title of Meritorious Artist of Georgia (1969), Ivane Javakhishvili and Shota Rustaveli national prizes, Order of Honor and Presidential Order of Excellence (2020), Honorary Citizenship of Tbilisi (2014) and others. In 2008 he was elected to the Parliament of Georgia for the ruling United National Movement party from the single-mandate district of Ozurgeti, but he resigned his parliamentary position in March 2009. He published memoirs and books on Georgian folk music.

Erkomaishvili died due to COVID-19-related complications in a hospital in Tbilisi on 31 March 2021. He was buried at the Mtatsminda Pantheon in Tbilisi.

References 

1940 births
2021 deaths
Folk singers from Georgia (country)
Folklorists from Georgia (country)
Recipients of the Order of Honor (Georgia)
Recipients of the Presidential Order of Excellence
Deaths from the COVID-19 pandemic in Georgia (country)
Members of the Parliament of Georgia
People from Batumi